Grant Wallace (1868–1954) was an American journalist, artist, screenwriter, Esperantist and occultist. He wrote short stories and screen plays, including two black and white silent movies.

Early life 
Grant Wallace was born on February 10, 1867, in Hopkins, Missouri, the son of a judge. His education included a B.S. from Western Normal College in Shenandoah, Iowa, in 1889, and art classes from the Art Students League of New York.

Career

In the 1890s, Wallace worked as a newspaper artist and reporter in Saint Paul, Minnesota at the St. Paul Pioneer Press before he moved to San Francisco. In San Francisco, he worked for the San Francisco Chronicle, and San Francisco Examiner, as an editorial and feature writer, and a war correspondent for the Evening Bulletin in Japan and China. He wrote short stories and screen plays, including for two black and white silent movies: the story for A Blowout at Santa Banana (1914), and the scenario for the movie The Fuel of Life (1917). He also lectured on the occult.

In this period he was also a promoter of the international language esperanto and he was the editor of the San Francisco Esperantist.

Occultism 

After World War I, Wallace built a small cabin in the forest near Carmel-by-the-Sea, California, which he used as a laboratory for experimenting with telepathy, which he sometimes referred to as "mental radio." He made hundreds of drawings, charts, diagrams, and writings, attempting to reveal the patterns of life, including reincarnation, communication with intelligent life on other planets, and with dead spirits. He wrote about messages from the dead, from ancient Greeks, ancient Egyptians, Vikings, and Atlanteans, to more recent dead, such as Thomas Jefferson and Charles Darwin, and transcribed messages from and drew pictures of extraterrestrial life, especially from the Pleiades star cluster.

Death
He died August 12, 1954, in Berkeley, California. 

His works were recovered from his Carmel cabin after his death, and some of his art and diagrams were included in The End is Near!, Visions of Apocalypse, Millennium and Utopia, published by Dilettante Press.

References

External links
 Dilettante Press  Page with bio and photos, by the publishers of "The End is Near", featuring many of his drawings and diagrams of the supernatural.
 
 The Fuel of Life Page on the movie by the AFI silent film catalog

 

1867 births
1954 deaths
American artists
American male journalists
American occultists
American male screenwriters
Order of the Precious Crown members
War correspondents of the Russo-Japanese War
People from Hopkins, Missouri
People from Shenandoah, Iowa
People from Carmel-by-the-Sea, California
Journalists from California
Screenwriters from California
Screenwriters from Iowa
Screenwriters from Missouri
20th-century American male writers
20th-century American screenwriters